A Terra-Cotta Warrior, also known as Fight and Love with a Terracotta Warrior, is a 1990 Hong Kong film based on the novel by Lilian Lee, directed by Ching Siu-tung and produced by Tsui Hark, starring Zhang Yimou and Gong Li. The film is about a forbidden love between a court lady and a soldier of the Qin Dynasty.  Gong Li plays the female protagonists Dong'er (the court girl) and Zhu Lili (the actress), and Zhang Yimou plays the terracotta warrior Meng Tianfang. This is one of the only two films where Zhang Yimou has a leading role, the other being Wu Tianming's Old Well. Warner Bros. has included the film in the catalogue of Warner Archive Collection.

Plot
The First Emperor searches for the elixir of immortality, and he despatches 500 teenage boys and girls to help him accomplish this task. One of his soldiers, General Meng Tianfang falls in love with one of the despatched maiden by the name Dong'er. When their forbidden love is exposed, the girl reveals she has found the elusive elixir and secretly gives it to Meng. The emperor orders their execution and the soldier is sentenced to death by being encased alive in clay as a terracotta warrior, only to be reawakened in the 1930s when a struggling actress, Zhu Lili, the reincarnation of the girl who remembers nothing of her past life, accidentally stumbles upon the tomb of the First Emperor. The soldier struggles to adapt to a new era while the two are pursued by archeological looters and thugs.

Cast
Zhang Yimou as General Meng Tianfang (Mong Tin-Fong) / Terra-Cotta Cleaner
Gong Li as Han Dong'er / Zhu Lili (Hon Tung Yee) / Japanese Tourist
Yu Rongguang as Bai Yunfei (Pak Wan Fei)
Wu Tianming as movie director
Lu Shuming as First Emperor
Che Bok-man as Xu Fu / tour guide (Tsui-Fok)
David Cheung as Yuen Mong Ling
Chiu Chi-gong
Choi Hin-cheung

International broadcast

See also
The Iceman Cometh

References

External links

1990 films
1990 fantasy films
Hong Kong fantasy adventure films
Films set in the Qin dynasty
Films directed by Ching Siu-tung
Mandarin-language films
Films with screenplays by Lilian Lee
1990s Hong Kong films
Hong Kong fantasy comedy films